Pacific Beach is a census-designated place (CDP) in Grays Harbor County, Washington, United States. The population was 291 at the 2010 census. Prior to 2010 it was part of the Moclips CDP.

Geography
Pacific Beach is located in western Grays Harbor County, along the Pacific Ocean. It is bordered to the north by Moclips and to the south by Joe Creek. The CDP includes the neighborhood of Highland Heights, north of Pacific Beach proper. State Route 109 passes through the CDP, leading north through Moclips  to its terminus at Taholah, and south  to Copalis Beach.

References

External links
 Pacific Beach community website

Census-designated places in Grays Harbor County, Washington
Census-designated places in Washington (state)
Populated coastal places in Washington (state)